Mali Brijun is an uninhabited Croatian island in the Adriatic Sea located west of Fažana.

Brioni Fort Minor is a coastal fortress in Mali Brijuni built by Austria in late 19th century in order to protect their main port of the Navy.

References

Islands of the Adriatic Sea
Islands of Croatia
Uninhabited islands of Croatia
Landforms of Istria County